Freimut Börngen (17 October 1930 – 19 June 2021) was a German astronomer and a prolific discoverer of minor planets. A few sources give his first name wrongly as "Freimuth". The Minor Planet Center credits him as F. Borngen.

He studied galaxies with the Schmidt telescope at the Karl Schwarzschild Observatory in Tautenburg, Germany. In 1995 he retired, but continued to work as a freelancer for the observatory. As a by-product of his work, he discovered numerous asteroids (519). The research on asteroids had to be done in his spare time, as the search for small objects was not considered prestigious enough by the GDR research managers. During the GDR regime, Börngen restricted himself to politically neutral names for his asteroids, such as topics related to Thuringia or famous scientists and composers. Examples include 2424 Tautenburg, 3181 Ahnert, 3245 Jensch, or 3941 Haydn. After the German reunification, he chose systematically historical, cultural, scientific and geographical namings, and at times honored amateur astronomers. Other names include references to resistance fighters against the Nazi suppression, or document a religious interest.

Freimut Börngen achieved great reputation in the international scientific community for his human qualities and the well-substantiated choice of names. In 2006, he was awarded the Bundesverdienstkreuz am Bande (Cross of Merit on ribbon) by German Federal President Horst Köhler.

The main-belt asteroid 3859 Börngen, discovered by astronomer Edward Bowell at the U.S. Anderson Mesa Station in 1987, was named in his honor. The naming and its citation was proposed and written by his colleague Lutz Schmadel, and published on 20 February 1989.

Freimut Börngen died on 19 June 2021 at the age of 90.

List of discovered minor planets 

Freimut Börngen is credited by the Minor Planet Center with the discovery of 538 numbered minor planets made between 1961 and 1995.

References 
 

1930 births
2021 deaths
Discoverers of asteroids

20th-century German astronomers
People from Halle (Saale)
Martin Luther University of Halle-Wittenberg alumni
Recipients of the Cross of the Order of Merit of the Federal Republic of Germany